The 1979–80 Boston Bruins season was the Bruins' 56th season. In the first round of the NHL Draft, the Bruins drafted defenseman Ray Bourque. The Bruins had two coaches during the season, Fred Creighton had a record of 40 wins, 20 losses and 13 ties, while Harry Sinden had 6 wins and 1 loss. The Bruins lost to the eventual Stanley Cup champions for the second season in a row, this time it was the New York Islanders in the second round of the Stanley Cup playoffs.

The last remaining active member of the 1979–80 Boston Bruins was defenseman Ray Bourque, who retired after the 2000–01 season, right after winning the Stanley Cup as a member of the Colorado Avalanche.

Offseason
Don Cherry was fired after the 1978–79 season. Fred Creighton, former coach of the Atlanta Flames was brought in to coach the Bruins.

Regular season
General Manager Harry Sinden fired Coach Creighton with 15 days to go in the regular season despite the Bruins' winning record with Creighton. Sinden, who had coached before, took over coaching duties as well.

Divisional standings

Schedule and results

|-
| 1979–80 Schedule

Playoffs
Lost Quarter-Finals (4-1) to New York Islanders 
Won Preliminary Round (3-2) over Pittsburgh Penguins

Player statistics

Regular season
Scoring

Goaltending

Playoffs
Scoring

Goaltending

Awards and records

Records

Milestones

Transactions

Trades

Free agents

Claimed from waivers

Draft picks
Boston's picks at the 1980 NHL Entry Draft were as follows:

See also
1979–80 NHL season

Farm teams

Awards and records
 Ray Bourque, Calder Memorial Trophy Winner

References
 Bruins on Database Hockey
 Bruins on Hockey Database
 Bruins on Hockey Reference

Boston Bruins seasons
Boston Bruins
Boston Bruins
Boston Bruins
Boston Bruins
Bruins
Bruins